Skater (formerly Skuter) is a Slovenian fusion dance music and turbo-folk duo comprising Samcy Jay and Nuša Rojs. The band's original name lampoons the German eurodance band Scooter.

Discography

Studio albums
Arrivederci (Cela Pametna Založba, 2005) [as Skuter]
Pridi k meni (Nika Records, 2008)

Maxi singles
Arrivederci Vanč (Nika Records, 2005) [as Skuter]

Compilation albums
Naredi da... se trese (2006) [as Skuter]

References

Slovenian musical groups
Parody musicians
Parodists
Pop-folk music groups